Iglesia de San Lesmes Abad is a Roman Catholic church in Burgos, Spain. 

It is located in the Plaza de San Juan, in front of the Public Library, adjacent to the Camino de Santiago. Built in the Gothic style in the 14th century, it contains the remains of Adelelmus of Burgos , the patron of the city. The church underwent restoration in 2012–13.

References

Roman Catholic churches in Burgos
Buildings and structures completed in the 14th century
Gothic architecture in Burgos